The Kingdom at the End of the Road is the third book in Jan Guillou's The Knight Templar (Crusades trilogy) book series. This book follows the fictional character of Arn Magnusson as he returns home to Sweden after 20 years as a Knight Templar.

The book starts with Arn coming home to the abbey in which he grew up and reuniting with his kinsmen. Arn, now an experienced knight, has great plans for Sweden. To build a superior and centralized fighting force to create a stable peace within the three countries that will one day be known as Sweden. He is also forced to repel two invasions by the Danish-supported pretender to the throne, Sverker Karlsson. 

This book covers the last part of Arn's life and argues that Arn is the de facto founding father of modern Sweden.

See also 
The Knight Templar (Crusades trilogy)
The Road to Jerusalem (1998),  the first book in the series
The Knight Templar (1999),  the second book in the series
The Heritage of Arn (2001),  a follow-up about Birger jarl, the founder of Stockholm - fictionalized to be Arn's grandson

2000 novels
Novels by Jan Guillou
Novels set during the Crusades
Novels set in Sweden
Novels set in the 12th century